Gorodishche is a rural locality (a village) in Yugskoye Rural Settlement, Cherepovetsky District, Vologda Oblast, Russia. The population was 54 as of 2002. There are 26 streets.

Geography 
Kostyayevka is the nearest rural locality.

References 

Rural localities in Cherepovetsky District